Blasi is a family name of Italian origin. It may refer to: 

 Enrico Blasi (born 1972), Canadian hockey player and coach 
 Ettore Blasi (1895–?),  Italian long-distance runner
 Gary Blasi, Professor of Law Emeritus at UCLA
 Ilary Blasi (born 1981), Italian showgirl and model
 Joseph Blasi, American economic sociologist
 Manuele Blasi (born 1980), Italian footballer
 Rosa Blasi (born 1972), American actress
 Scott Blasi (born 1973), American horse trainer
 Silverio Blasi (1921–1995), Italian director, actor and writer
 Umberto Blasi (1886–1938),  Italian long-distance runner
 Debra Di Blasi (born 1957), American author and screenwriter
Italian-language surnames

Surnames from given names